Lalgola is a census town in the Lalgola CD block in the Lalbag subdivision of Murshidabad district, West Bengal. It is a terminal railway station on the Ranaghat-Lalgola branch line. The distance between Lalgola railway station and Krishnapur railway station is one of the shortest distance between two railway stations in India (1.7 km). It is also a border checkpoint but presently non functional due to some unknown reasons.

Backdrop
Lalgola is a trading hub situated near Bangladesh-India border surrounded by a number of large and small lakes (dighis).It was a settlement which came into existence after the Permanent Settlement in Bengal in 1793 by the Bhumihar Brahmin (Kaushik Gotra of kusaunjhiya Clan) Zamindar employed by The British East India Company. It was one of the prominent businesses hubs in then Murshidabad. Mainly agricultural products were collected and exported to different corner of the country. The remnant of the Palaces, called Rajbari, is still present. In one of these palaces Lalgola Open Air Correctional Home is established. It is the only one open air correctional home in West Bengal which runs here since 1986. The Lalgola Palace had been gifted to the government by Maharaja Jogendra Narayan Rai.

Geography

Location
It is located near the Padma River, which is the principal distributary of the Ganges, and which forms the border between India and Bangladesh in this area; thus Bangladesh bounds the town on the north and east. The average elevation is about 

The climate is similar to the rest of Gangetic West Bengal.

Border checkpoint
Lalgola is a border checkpoint on the Bangladesh-India border. On the other side is Godagiri, across the Padma.

Area overview
While the Lalbag subdivision is spread across both the natural physiographic regions of the district, Rarh and Bagri, the Domkal subdivision occupies the north-eastern corner of Bagri. In the map alongside, the Ganges/ Padma River flows along the northern portion. The border with Bangladesh can be seen in the north and the east. Murshidabad district shares with Bangladesh a porous international border which is notoriously crime prone (partly shown in this map). The Ganges has a tendency to change course frequently, causing severe erosion, mostly along the southern bank. The historic city of Murshidabad, a centre of major tourist attraction, is located in this area. In 1717, when Murshid Quli Khan became Subahdar, he made Murshidabad the capital of Subah Bangla (then Bengal, Bihar and Odisha). The entire area is overwhelmingly rural with over 90% of the population living in the rural areas.

Note: The map alongside presents some of the notable locations in the subdivisions. All places marked in the map are linked in the larger full screen map.

Civic administration

Police station
Lalgola police station has jurisdiction over Lalgola CD block.

CD block HQ
The headquarters of Lalgola CD block are located at Lalgola.

Open Air Jail
Probably, the most special thing about Lalgola is that, the first 'Open Air Jail', officially Lalgola Open Air Correctional Home, was founded here in the year 1987.  For this purpose Sri Birendra Narayan Roy, popularly known as Biren Roy, descendants of Lalgola Raj family and erstwhile king of Lalgola, gifted their residential palace to the Government.  Royal residence made way first for female lunatic convicts and later, from 1987, the open-air correctional home.
Open Air Correctional Home is a relatively new and revolutionary concept. Convicts sentenced to imprisonment for a period of 7 years or more and such of them as have already served 2/3 of their sentence and have maintained all along a good jail record are eligible for transfer to the open jail after thorough screening and personal interview by a board constituted for such selection.
Surprisingly, inmates get freedom to go out during day time (06:00 hrs to 20:00 hrs). They have their own source of income in the forms of cultivation, goods shops (given by the Prison Authority), Private Tuition. They even get quarters for their families.

Demographics
According to the 2011 Census of India, Lalgola had a total population of 31,698, of which 16,147 (51%) were males and 15,551 (49%) were females. Population in the age range 0–6 years was 4,290. The total number of literate persons in Lalgola was 19,797 (72.23% of the population over 6 years).

Economy
As a trading town and transit point for farm products, Lalgola is visited daily by hundreds of people from the surrounding villages.

Education

Lalgola College was established in 2006 and began offering courses in the 2007–08 academic year, under the University of Kalyani.

The Lalgola Mahesh Narayan Academy provides education up to class XII.  It was established in 1914 by Maharaja Jogendra Narayan Ray, the Maharaja of Lalgola, in memory of his foster father.

The Lalgola Rahmatullah High Madrasah was established in 1919. It was also patronized by Maharaja. Initially it was affiliated with Dhaka Board. It is now affiliated to West Bengal Board of Madrasa Education .

Other schools include Sailaja Memorial Girls' High School and Laskarpur High School (HS) Al Mahadus Salafi10th standard Bengali Medium School privately organised, for Muslims and Shree Padmaprava Digamber Jain Vidyalaya English Medium School, Synergy Mission School, Ramkrishna Vidyapith; and Chamapara Primary School.

A public library, the Lalgola Mahesh Narayan Academy Town Library, was established in 1913.

Keeping in mind the value of advanced education, 4 new colleges have started in lalgola. (BMTTI) Belayat Munsi Teachers Training College (D.Ed and B.Ed) courses degree, Abdus Sattar Memorial College of Education, Madan Mohan Roy Teachers Training College, The Agnibina College of Education (D.Ed)

Culture
Almost all major and minor Hindu and Muslim festivals are celebrated here.  A popular Bengali proverb is baro mase tero parbon, translated as thirteen festivals in twelve months.

One of the main festivals is the Hindu Durga Puja, when pandals (ceremonial structures) are constructed throughout the town. 

The Muslim Eid ul-Fitr and Eid al-Adha is also celebrated here.  A number of local festivals are also held, including the local Flower Show and Exhibition, held every January since 1986 and also a Local Football event called Lalgola Challenge Cup which is organised by the local voluntary organization.

Healthcare
There is one hospital in the town, Krishnapur Primary Health Centre.  A number of local and visiting doctors are also available for consultation.  A local voluntary organisation, Lalgola Sanjeeban, works in health-related fields.

See also
River bank erosion along the Ganges in Malda and Murshidabad districts

References

Villages in Murshidabad district